Lick My Decals Off, Baby is the fourth studio album by American band Captain Beefheart and the Magic Band, released in December 1970 by Straight and Reprise Records. The follow-up to Trout Mask Replica (1969), it is regarded by some critics and listeners as superior, and was Van Vliet's favorite. Van Vliet said that the title was an encouragement to "get rid of the labels", and to evaluate things according to their merits rather than according to superficial labels (or "decals").

Composition
Musicians on the album were Don Van Vliet, vocals, harmonica, and woodwinds; Bill Harkleroad, guitar; Mark Boston, bass; Art Tripp, marimba, drums, and percussion; and John French, drums. French had been arranger and musical director on Trout Mask Replica. Van Vliet ejected French from the group—both figuratively and literally, by allegedly throwing him down a flight of stairs—shortly after Trout Mask Replica was completed, and these roles passed to guitarist Bill Harkleroad. French returned to the group shortly before recording began.

Most of the songs began as piano improvisations by Van Vliet. He would record extended improvisation sessions on a cassette recorder. Harkleroad then listened to these improvisations, picked out the best parts, and pieced them into compositions. The musical lines on Decals tend to be longer and more intricate than the assemblage of short fragments that characterized much of Trout Mask Replica. The album's liner notes contain two poems or lyrics for songs not present, one untitled and the other "You Should Know by the Kindness of uh Dog the Way uh Human Should Be".

Critical and commercial reception
Critic Robert Christgau said of the record: "Beefheart's famous five-octave range and covert totalitarian structures have taken on a playful undertone, repulsive and engrossing and slapstick funny." Lester Bangs noted the maturation of Beefheart’s previous musical and lyrical concerns, writing that "even though the sonic textures are sometimes even more complex and angular than on Trout Mask, ... his messages are universal and warm as the hearth of the America we once dreamed of".

Due to John Peel's championing of the work on BBC radio, Lick My Decals Off, Baby spent eleven weeks on the UK Albums Chart, peaking at number twenty. This remains Beefheart's highest-charting album in the UK.

An early promotional music video was made of its title song, and a bizarre television commercial was also filmed that included excerpts from "Woe-Is-uh-Me-Bop", silent footage of masked Magic Band members using kitchen utensils as musical instruments, and Beefheart kicking over a bowl of what appears to be porridge onto a dividing stripe in the middle of a road. The video was rarely played but was accepted into the Museum of Modern Art, where it has been used in several programs.

Enigma Retro released a compact disc edition in 1989; the album has also seen reissue as a 180g vinyl LP, which is still in print. In January 2011, shortly after Van Vliet's death, iTunes and Amazon's MP3 store released the album for download. On November 17, 2014, Rhino Records reissued the album as part of a limited-edition four-disc Beefheart box set Sun Zoom Spark: 1970 to 1972, which also included The Spotlight Kid, Clear Spot, and a disc of outtakes from the three albums. The album was reissued separately, with no bonus tracks, by Rhino on September 25, 2015.

Track listing
All songs initially composed by Don Van Vliet. Arranged by Bill Harkleroad.

Personnel
 Captain Beefheart – vocals, bass clarinet, tenor sax, soprano sax, harmonica
 Zoot Horn Rollo – electric guitar and glass finger guitar
 Rockette Morton – bassius-o-pheilius
 Drumbo – percussion, broom
 Ed Marimba – marimba, percussion, broom

Production
 Grant Gibb – personal management
 Peacock Ink – album concept
 Don Van Vliet – back cover painting
 Ed Thrasher – photography and art direction

References

1970 albums
Albums produced by Captain Beefheart
Captain Beefheart albums
Enigma Records albums
Reprise Records albums
Straight Records albums
Avant-pop albums